Spontaneous Illumination was Entheogenic's second and most successful album. It was released in November 2003 for the German label C.O.R.N. Recordings and went to Number 1 on the German Chill-Out Charts, where it remained at number 1 for 8 weeks. Spontaneous Illumination stayed in the Top 10 for an additional 12 weeks.

Track listing
"Ground Luminosity" – 11:42
"Habitual Overtones" – 8:54
"Pagan Dream Machine" – 9:45
"Mindless" – 9:41
"Invisible Landscapes" – 9:35
"Twilight Eyes" – 12:32
"Spaced" – 9:47

External links
c.o.r.n. recordings label homepage
Spontaneous Illumination at CDBaby.com includes reviews, description, samples and the option to purchase this album
Spontaneous Illumination at PsyShop.com - Includes a description, samples and the option to purchase this album

Entheogenic (band) albums